Murphy's Mob is a British children's television series, created and written by Brian Finch which was produced and directed by David Foster for Central Independent Television, and screened in the UK on ITV for four series between 1 March 1982 and 19 December 1985. The theme tune was sung by Gary Holton, of Auf Wiedersehen, Pet fame.

Plot
The series featured Ken Hutchison as Mac Murphy, who takes charge as manager of a struggling fictional Third Division football club, Dunmore United, and a group of young supporters of the club whose day-to-day troubles included attempts to set up a junior supporter's club and clubhouse within the stadium.

Cast
 Ken Hutchison as Mac Murphy
 Lynda Bellingham as Elaine Murphy
 Terence Budd as Rasputin Jones
 Milton Johns as Derek Cassidy
 Amanda Mealing as Sheila
 Tracy Lynn Stephens as Jean
 Keith Jayne as Boxer
 Lewis Stevens as Wurzel
 Chris Gascoyne as Judd
 Wayne Norman as Gerry 'Geronimo'

Production
The drama scenes also included action taken from real Watford games from the era. The fictional Dunmore team therefore played in yellow, red and black to allow the footage to be cut into the drama. Billy Wright, the former England captain is credited in the first series as "Soccer Advisor".

Broadcast
The show was broadcast twice weekly on ITV

Series 1
 16 episodes generally broadcast on Monday and Wednesday between 1 March and 26 April 1982
Series 2
 12 episodes generally broadcast on Wednesday and Thursday between 9 March and 14 April 1983
Series 3
 14 episodes generally broadcast on Monday and Thursday between 29 October and 13 December 1984
Series 4
 12 episodes generally broadcast on Monday and Thursday between 11 November and 20 December 1985

References

External links

1982 British television series debuts
1985 British television series endings
ITV children's television shows
English-language television shows
Television shows produced by Central Independent Television
Fictional association football television series